Zoltán Takács may refer to:

 Zoltán Takács (musician) (born 1980), Hungarian musician and record producer
 Zoltán Takács (footballer) (born 1983), Hungarian footballer
 Zoltán Takács (toxinologist), Hungarian-born toxinologist and tropical adventurer